Samuela Yavala (born 24 August 1947) is a Fijian sprinter. He competed in the men's 400 metres at the 1972 Summer Olympics.

References

External links

1947 births
Living people
Athletes (track and field) at the 1972 Summer Olympics
Fijian male sprinters
Olympic athletes of Fiji
Athletes (track and field) at the 1974 British Commonwealth Games
Athletes (track and field) at the 1986 Commonwealth Games
Commonwealth Games competitors for Fiji
Place of birth missing (living people)